The 2016 Missouri Valley Conference men's basketball tournament, popularly referred to as "Arch Madness", was the Missouri Valley Conference's postseason tournament which was held March 3–6, 2016 at the Scottrade Center in St. Louis. The tournament was won by Northern Iowa, who defeated Evansville in the championship game. As a result, Northern Iowa received the conference's automatic bid to the NCAA tournament.

Seeds
Teams were seeded by conference record, with ties broken by record between the tied teams followed by non-conference strength of schedule, if necessary. The top six seeds received first round byes.

Schedule

Tournament bracket

* denotes overtime period

2015–16 Missouri Valley Conference men's basketball season
Missouri Valley Conference men's basketball tournament